Kfar Melki, also known as Kafrmelki or Kfarmilki, is a town in the Sidon District, South Governorate, Lebanon. It is situated 11 kilometres east of Sidon.

Kfar Melki is located in the Kaza of Saida one of Mohafazah of South Lebanon kazas (districts). Mohafazah of South Lebanon is one of the eight mohafazats (governorates) of Lebanon. Kfarmelki surface stretches for 

Kfar Melki was the birthplace of footballer Mahmoud Hamoud.

References

External links
 Official web page
 Localiban Kfar Melki

Populated places in Sidon District